The Canon EOS 40D is a 10.1-megapixel semi-professional digital single-lens reflex camera. It was initially announced on 20 August 2007 and was released at the end of that month. It is the successor of the Canon EOS 30D, and is succeeded by the EOS 50D. It can accept EF and EF-S lenses.  Like its predecessor, it uses an APS-C sized image sensor, resulting in a 1.6x field of view crop factor.

Improvements
Changes over the 30D include a higher-resolution sensor (10.1 megapixel instead of 8.2). The sensor also has better noise control than previous models. The 40D has a larger memory buffer so more pictures can be taken in succession without a slow down in frame rate. Frames per second has been increased from 5 to 6.5.

The 40D adds a new format, Canon's sRAW, which is a smaller RAW image for smaller prints and reduced file sizes. The 40D's RAW format is 14-bit instead of the 12-bit of the 30D.

The camera uses the new DIGIC III image processor, which was first used in the Canon EOS-1D Mark III, introduced earlier that year. Canon's DIGIC III processor delivers responsive operation, improved color rendering and near-instant start-up time. A new sensor cleaning system has been introduced. It can also use the Canon Wireless File Transmitter WFT-E3/E3A.

The 40D has a larger screen (3", of the same resolution of 320 × 240 pixel = 76,800 pixels) than the 30D (2.5"). There is also a new menu for external and internal flash control, including second curtain sync.

Other additions on the Canon 40D include interchangeable focusing screens, an AF-ON button, the EOS Integrated Cleaning System for sensor dust reduction, rubber strips around the battery and CF doors for improved weather sealing and three new optional accessories: an IS version of the 18-55mm kit lens; a new backward-compatible, live view mode, and a weather-sealed battery grip.

Overview and features

The 40D has many similar characteristics to its predecessors the 20D and 30D, but also many differences.  This includes various shooting modes, ability to change ISO and white balance, a pop-up flash unit, an LCD screen of 3.0 inches (an upgrade from the previous model, the Canon EOS 30D with a screen of only 2.5 inches), and a rugged magnesium alloy protective inner-shell, which both the Canon 30D and 40D have.

The newest feature to the 40D is Live View (previously used on the EOS 20Da), allowing photographers to use the LCD screen as their viewfinder. It is very useful for taking pictures low to the ground, when the eye cannot reach the viewfinder. The shutter noise is quieter in this mode as well.
 10.1 megapixel APS-C CMOS sensor
 DIGIC III processor
 3.0 inch LCD Monitor
 14-bit Processor
 Live View Mode
 Wide 9-point AF (all points are cross-type with the centre point having an additional f/2.8 sensitive cross-type sensor placed diagonally)
 Selectable AF and metering modes
 Built in Flash
 EOS Integrated Cleaning System
 ISO 100–1600 (3200 with custom function)
 Continuous Drive up to 6.5 frame/s (75 images (JPEG), 17 images (RAW))
 Canon EF/EF-S Lenses
 Canon EX Speedlites
 PAL/NTSC video output
 File Formats include: JPEG, RAW, sRAW (both RAW formats are 14-bit)
 RAW & JPEG simultaneous recording
 USB 2.0 computer interface
 BP-511/BP-511A or BP-512/BP-514 Battery Types (BP-511A battery supplied)
 Tough inner metal (magnesium alloy) shell
 Approx Weight 0.822 kg

Firmware and software
, the latest firmware is 1.1.1, released 20 January 2009. The firmware updates have fixed some bugs, and made minor changes in operation.

Canon released its DPP 3.1 RAW converter alongside the 40D.

Initially, Adobe Lightroom did not have official support for the 40D though RAW and JPEGs from the camera did still work. Official support for the 40D as well as the 1Ds Mark III was added with Lightroom 1.3, available as a free update from Adobe.

References

External links

 Canon EOS 40D Review, Phil Askey, October 2007 @ Digital Photography Review
 Steves Digicams – Canon EOS 40D – Hands on Review

40D
Live-preview digital cameras